Malaya Privalovka is a rural locality (a selo) and the administrative center of Maloprivalovskoye Rural Settlement, Verkhnekhavsky District, Voronezh Oblast, Russia. The population was 435 as of 2010. There are 9 streets.

Geography 
Malaya Privalovka is located 20 km west of Verkhnyaya Khava (the district's administrative centre) by road. Zheldayevka is the nearest rural locality.

References 

Rural localities in Verkhnekhavsky District